The 1932 Bulgarian State Football Championship was the ninth edition of the competition. It was contested by 13 teams, and it was won by Shipchenski sokol Varna, the team that had lost the Championship's previous final.

First round

|}

Quarter-finals

|}

Semi-finals

|}

Final

References

Bulgarian State Football Championship seasons
1
1
Bul
Bul